In enzymology, an urethanase is an enzyme that catalyzes the chemical reaction

urethane + H2O  ethanol + CO2 + NH3

Thus, the two substrates of this enzyme are urethane and H2O, whereas its 3 products are ethanol, CO2, and NH3.

This enzyme belongs to the family of hydrolases, those acting on carbon-nitrogen bonds other than peptide bonds, specifically in linear amides.  The systematic name of this enzyme class is urethane amidohydrolase (decarboxylating). This enzyme is also called urethane hydrolase.

References

 

EC 3.5.1
Enzymes of unknown structure